The Kenya national athletics team represents Kenya at the international athletics competitions such as Olympic Games or World Athletics Championships.

Medal count
Kenya has participated in 14 of the 28 editions of the Summer Olympic Games from 1896 to 2016.

See also
Athletics Kenya
Kenya at the Olympics
List of Kenyan records in athletics
Athletics Summer Olympics medal table
World Championships medal table

References

External links
Athletics at Summer Olympics

National team
Athletics
Kenya